Lily Lodge (April 12, 1930 – August 7, 2021) was an American actress, acting coach and etiquette consultant. She was the co-founder of Actors Conservatory in New York City and worked with actors such as Alec Baldwin and Brooke Shields.

Personal life 
Lily was a member of the Lodge family and was the daughter of career diplomat John Davis Lodge, who also served as the Governor of Connecticut. Her mother, Francesca Braggiotti, was an Italian dancer and actress. Her uncle was vice-presidential candidate Henry Cabot Lodge Jr. Lodge had two sons, George and James Lewis Marcus Jr. She died on August 7, 2021, at the age of 91.

Career
Lodge appeared on an episode of Play of the Week in 1960, an episode of Naked City in 1963, and in Mona Lisa Smile in 2003, Lodge played an uncredited role in the 1933 literary adaptation Little Women, a notable pre-code film.

Lodge later worked as a crew member of the 2013 adaptation of The Great Gatsby as an acting coach. She worked as an etiquette consultant for Kate & Leopold, released in 2001, and The Age of Innocence, released in 1993.

Actors Conservatory
Lily Lodge was the director of the Actors Conservatory in New York City, where actors develop through the use of sense memory.

Filmography
Little Women (1933 film) (Lily) (uncredited)
The Play of the Week (1960)
Naked City (TV series) (1963) (Olga)
Say Yes (1986) (New York Woman)
Mona Lisa Smile (2003) (House Matron)

References

External links
Actors Conservatory

1932 births
2021 deaths
American acting coaches
American film actresses
American people of Italian descent
Cabot family
Gardiner family
Lodge family